The 2012 NBL season was the 31st season of the National Basketball League. While the Harbour Heat returned for the 2012 season, the Waikato Pistons dropped out of the league. It marked the first time the league had no Waikato presence since 1983.

The Hawke's Bay Hawks were regular season winners in 2012. The final Four weekend was held in Wellington, with the semifinals on Saturday 26 May, followed by the championship game on Sunday 27 May. In the final, the Auckland Pirates were victorious over the two-time defending champion Wellington Saints.

Team information

Summary

Regular season standings

Final Four

Awards

Player of the Week

Statistics leaders
Stats as of the end of the regular season

Regular season
 Most Valuable Player: Nick Horvath (Manawatu Jets)
 NZ Most Valuable Player: Nick Horvath (Manawatu Jets)
 Most Outstanding Guard: Lindsay Tait (Auckland Pirates)
 Most Outstanding NZ Guard: Lindsay Tait (Auckland Pirates)
 Most Outstanding Forward: Nick Horvath (Manawatu Jets)
 Most Outstanding NZ Forward/Centre: Nick Horvath (Manawatu Jets)
 Scoring Champion: Josh Pace (Manawatu Jets)
 Rebounding Champion: Nick Horvath (Manawatu Jets)
 Assist Champion: Jason Crowe (Wellington Saints)
 Rookie of the Year: Reuben Te Rangi (Harbour Heat)
 Coach of the Year: Paul Henare (Hawke's Bay Hawks)
 All-Star Five:
 G: Lindsay Tait (Auckland Pirates)
 G: Paora Winitana (Hawke's Bay Hawks)
 F: Josh Pace (Manawatu Jets)
 F: Antoine Tisby (Otago Nuggets)
 C: Nick Horvath (Manawatu Jets)

Final Four
 Finals MVP: Alex Pledger (Auckland Pirates)

References

External links
Basketball New Zealand 2012 Results Annual
2012 League Handbook
2012 Overall Rankings Report
2012 Overall Rankings List

National Basketball League (New Zealand) seasons
NBL